Glenn Verbauwhede (born 19 May 1985) is a Belgian former professional football goalkeeper and a football agent.

Career
Verbauwhede joined Club Brugge from KSV Waregem in 1997. He was promoted to the first-team squad in 2004. In summer 2008, he was loaned out to Kortrijk.

In January 2012, he joined Westerlo. After almost a year of without a club, free agent Verbauwhede joined Mamelodi Sundowns in spring 2013.

Following a stint with Maritzburg United, Verbauwhede retired from playing professional football and began a career as a football player agent. He currently represents South African footballer Ayanda Patosi.

References

External links
 
 

1985 births
Living people
Sportspeople from Kortrijk
Footballers from West Flanders
Association football goalkeepers
Belgian footballers
Belgian Pro League players
Club Brugge KV players
K.V. Kortrijk players
K.V.C. Westerlo players
Mamelodi Sundowns F.C. players
Free State Stars F.C. players
Maritzburg United F.C. players
Association football agents
Belgian expatriate footballers
Expatriate soccer players in South Africa